Margrave Charles William Eugene of Baden-Rodemachern (1627–1666), was Margrave of Baden-Rodemachern and canon in Cologne.  He was a son of Margrave Herman Fortunatus from his first marriage with Antonia Elizabeth (d. 12 January 1635), a daughter of Christopher of Criechingen.

He was chamberlain to King Ferdinand IV and canon of the cathedral chapter in Cologne.  With his death, the younger line of Baden-Rodemachern died out and Baden-Rodemachern fell back to Baden-Baden — although Rodemachern itself was occupied by France at the time.

Ancestors

See also 
 List of rulers of Baden

References 
 Johann Christian Sachs: Einleitung in die Geschichte der Marggravschaft und des marggrävlichen altfürstlichen Hauses Baden, Karlsruhe, 1769, part 3, p. 312,

Footnotes 

Margraves of Baden
1627 births
1666 deaths
17th-century German people